Sagvåg is a village in Stord municipality in Vestland county, Norway. Nysæter Church was built here in 1991 to serve the population of the village. The small mining village of Litlabø lies just northeast of Sagvåg.

This makes it Sunnhordland's second largest community, after the nearby town of Leirvik.

Wärtsilä Norway AS has a factory in Sagvåg, producing automation systems for the marine industry. The harbour of Sagvåg is noted to be excellent for visiting leisure boats. There was considerable shipbuilding activities in Sagvåg up until the 1960s, building wooden fishing and whaling vessels.  Prior to the Triangle Link bridges and tunnel in 2001, Sagvåg was a ferry port with regular ferry routes connecting Stord and Bømlo to the west.

References

Villages in Vestland
Stord